Lutcher Memorial Church Building, now the First Presbyterian Church of Orange, Texas, is a historic church at 902 W. Green Avenue in Orange, Texas.

It was built in 1912 and added to the National Register of Historic Places in 1982.

See also

National Register of Historic Places listings in Orange County, Texas
Recorded Texas Historic Landmarks in Orange County

References

External links

Presbyterian churches in Texas
Churches on the National Register of Historic Places in Texas
Neoclassical architecture in Texas
Churches completed in 1912
20th-century Presbyterian church buildings in the United States
Buildings and structures in Orange County, Texas
1912 establishments in Texas
National Register of Historic Places in Orange County, Texas
Recorded Texas Historic Landmarks
Tourist attractions in Orange County, Texas
Neoclassical church buildings in the United States